Andi Reservoir, also known as Xianyuan Lake, is a large reservoir located in Andi Town of Jinhua, Zhejiang, China. The reservoir is the source of the Mei Stream, a tributary of Wuyi River.

History
Construction of Andi Reservoir, designed by the local government, commenced in 1959 and was completed in 1965.

Function
Andi Reservoir belongs to the first grade water source protection area and is part of Jinhua's water supply network.

The reservoir provides drinking water and water for irrigation and recreational activities.

Public Access  
Andi Reservoir open to visitors for free. Fishing and hiking are activities around the reservoir.

Gallery

References

Geography of Jinhua
Tourist attractions in Jinhua
Reservoirs in Zhejiang